Statistics of the 1971 Cameroonian Premier League season.

Overview
Aigle Nkongsamba won the championship.

References
Cameroon - List of final tables (RSSSF)

1971 in Cameroonian football
Cam
Cam
Elite One seasons